A total of 82 players made their debut in the Australian Football League's 1998 season, while another 39 players debuted for a new club having previously played for another club.

Debuts

References

Australian rules football records and statistics
Australian rules football-related lists
1998 in Australian rules football